In mathematics, in the study of fractals, a Hutchinson operator is the collective action of a set of contractions, called an iterated function system. The iteration of the operator converges to a unique attractor, which is the often self-similar fixed set of the operator.

Definition
Let  be an iterated function system, or a set of contractions from a compact set  to itself.  The operator  is defined over subsets  as

A key question is to describe the attractors  of this operator, which are compact sets. One way of generating such a set is to start with an initial compact set  (which can be a single point, called a seed) and iterate  as follows

and taking the limit, the iteration converges to the attractor

Properties
Hutchinson showed in 1981 the existence and uniqueness of the attractor .

The collection of functions  together with composition form a monoid. With N functions, then one may visualize the monoid as a full N-ary tree or a Cayley tree.

References

Fractals